Circe, minor planet designation 34 Circe, is a large, very dark main-belt asteroid. It was discovered by French astronomer J. Chacornac on April 6, 1855, and named after Circe, the bewitching queen of Aeaea island in Greek mythology.

The spectrum of this object matches a C-type asteroid, suggesting a carbonaceous composition. It has a cross-section size of 113 km and is orbiting the Sun with a period of 4.40 years. Photometric observations of this asteroid made during 2007 at the Organ Mesa Observatory in Las Cruces, New Mexico gave an asymmetrical bimodal light curve with a period of 12.176 ± 0.002 hours and a brightness variation of 0.17 ± 0.02 in magnitude. The spectra of the asteroid displays evidence of aqueous alteration.

References

External links
 
 

C-type asteroids (Tholen)
Circe
Ch-type asteroids (SMASS)
Background asteroids
Circe
Circe
18550406